Diaphorodoris lirulatocauda is a species of sea slug, a dorid nudibranch, a shell-less marine gastropod mollusc in the family Calycidorididae.

Distribution
This species was described from Earl's Cove, British Columbia, . It occurs from Alaska south to Baja California, Mexico.

References

Onchidorididae
Gastropods described in 1985